Moon Over Miami is a 1941 American musical film directed by Walter Lang, with Betty Grable and Don Ameche in leading roles and co-starring Robert Cummings, Carole Landis, Jack Haley, and Charlotte Greenwood. It was adapted from the play by Stephen Powys.

It was one of Haley's last appearances in a major, large-budgeted film; after 1943,  he made mostly B-pictures. The film's original songs were written by Leo Robin and Ralph Rainger.

Synopsis
Sisters Kay and Barbara Latimer are working as carhops in a Texas drive-in restaurant with their aunt Susan, the cook, when they are notified that an expected inheritance of $55,000 is only $4,000 after taxes and fees. Determined to marry a millionaire, Kay talks Barbara and Susan into spending the money on a trip to Miami, where she hopes to hook a rich man at a resort.

With Barbara posing as Kay's secretary and Susan as her maid, the three women check into the Flamingo Hotel and make the acquaintance of Jack O'Hara, a bartender who pontificates about his hatred of fortune hunters. Jack, who quickly becomes enamored with Susan, believes that Kay is on the level and promises to steer her away from gold diggers.

Kay finagles an invitation to a party being hosted by rich Jeffrey Bolton, and while there, also meets Phil McNeil, heir to the renowned McNeil Mines. Boyhood friends Jeff and Phil begin a fierce rivalry for Kay, who cannot make up her mind between the two handsome men, nor does she notice that Barbara has fallen in love with Jeff.

At the end of three weeks, the women are in trouble because they need $150 to pay their hotel bill, but Susan borrows the money from Jack, who has proposed to her. Realizing that she needs to get one of the men to propose to her that evening, Kay brings Barbara along to a dance to keep one of them occupied. Kay gets Barbara to dance with Jeff while she talks with Phil, with whom she has fallen in love.

Phil admits to her that he is broke, and that the McNeil Mines will not be profitable again for at least five years. Kay confesses that she, too, came to Miami to find a rich spouse, and the pair reluctantly agrees to pursue other partners. Phil tells Jeff that Kay loves him, after which she accepts Jeff's proposal.

As the women are packing to leave for Jeff's father's island, however,  Jack overhears them talking about their scheme and threatens to tell Jeff. After locking Jack in the bathroom, the women leave for the island, where they meet William, Jeff's businessman father. Desperate to see Kay again, Phil goes to the island and volunteers to be Jeff's best man. The women are also stunned by the arrival of Jack, who threatens to tell all if he determines that Kay does not really love Jeff.

On the night of a party that Jeff is throwing for Kay, Barbara encourages Jeff to accept a challenging job in South America to escape from under his father's shadow, while Phil admits to Kay that he loves her. As Phil is trying to persuade Kay that they belong together no matter what, Jeff enters the room. Phil and Kay explain that they are going to get married, and Jeff acknowledges that he has loved Barbara all along and will marry her.

Soon all ends well, as Susan and Jack also come to a romantic conclusion, and the three couples begin their lives together.

Cast

Betty Grable as Kathryn 'Kay' Latimer, "Miss Adams"
Don Ameche as Phil O'Neil
Robert Cummings as Jeffrey Boulton II
Carole Landis as Barbara Latimer, "Miss Sears"
Jack Haley as Jack O'Hara
Charlotte Greenwood as Aunt Susan Latimer

Production
The film was called Miami originally based on a novel by Stephen Powy. In May 1941 the title was changed to Moon Over Miami.

In December 1940 Walter Lang was assigned to direct. Betty Grable was set as star and George Seaton was finishing the script. In January it was announced Jack Haley and Charlotte Greenwood would join the film. Shortly afterwards Don Ameche, Robert Cummings and Carole Landis were cast. Filming was to have started 20 January 1941. However filming was pushed back to enable Cummings to finish The Devil and Miss Jones and for Ameche to complete Kiss the Boys Goodbye. Cobina Wright Jr replaced Lyn Bari who went into Sun Valley Serenade.

Accolades
The film is recognized by American Film Institute:
 2006: AFI's Greatest Movie Musicals – nominated

References

External links

1941 musical comedy films
1941 films
American musical comedy films
20th Century Fox films
Films directed by Walter Lang
Films set in Miami
Films shot in Miami
1940s English-language films
1940s American films